Pädagogische Hochschule Schwäbisch Gmünd (also known as PH Schwäbisch Gmünd, PHSG or University of Education Schwäbisch Gmünd) is a public research university located in Schwäbisch Gmünd, Baden-Württemberg, Germany. Founded in 1825 as Pädagogisches Institut Schwäbisch Gmünd, it was transformed into a university in 1962 and now is a part of the Pädagogische Hochschulsystem Baden-Württemberg. It is one out of six such universities in the state of Baden-Württemberg (the other five being PH Karlsruhe, PH Ludwigsburg, PH Freiburg, PH Weingarten and PH Heidelberg).

The university consists of two faculties and offers nine bachelor degree programmes as well as 11 master degree programmes. PH Schwäbisch Gmünd comprises two major campuses; one in Oberbettringen (main campus and administration) and one in downtown Schwäbisch Gmünd (campus for music students). The language of instruction is usually German, but there are also courses held in English and other modern foreign languages.

PH Schwäbisch Gmünd holds several awards including the Helmuth-Lang-Price as well as the Irma-Schmücker-Price. The PH Schwäbisch Gmünd is also ranked as one of the top universities of Baden-Württemberg.

History 
PH Schwäbisch Gmünd has a nearly 200 year long tradition. It was originally founded as a seminar in 1825 at the old campus in downtown Schwäbisch Gmünd. After several reforms, the Seminar transformed into a scientific university with the right to promotion and habilitation. The newly founded Pädagogische Hochschule moved to the Campus Hardt at the edge of Schwäbisch Gmünd.

Timeline 

 1825: opening as a catholic seminar in the old "Franziskaner Mannskloster" in Schwäbisch Gmünd to educate teachers
 1837: revolt in the "Gmünder Seminar"
 1839: 74 seminarists are enlisted in the seminar
 1849: newly religious impacts of the "Tübinger Schule" influence the seminar
 1860: opening of a private, catholic teacher seminar
 1866 - 1899: education of teachers takes three years + internship at scholar institutions
 1874: blackboards are introduced
 1905: move to a seminar building at Lessingstraße in Schwäbisch Gmünd
 1934: closing of the seminar by the Nazi Regime
 1937: closing of the teacher's seminar
 1946: re-opening of the teacher's seminar after World War II ends
 1947: teacher's seminar renames itself to Pädagogisches Institut (Educational Institute)
 1962: Pädagogisches Institut transforms into a Pädagogische Hochschule (Educational University School) with 440 students
 1965: extension of the studies to six semesters
 1971: educational universities in Baden-Württemberg get the status of scientific research universities
 1972: moving to the new campus at Schwäbisch Gmünd - Hardt
 1975: 1,700 students enrolled at the PH Schwäbisch Gmünd
 1975: extension of the degrees to not only teaching specific ones
 1984: first international university partnership with the University of Central England in Birmingham
 1985: co-operation agreement with Universität Tübingen for promotion
 1987: educational universities in Baden-Württemberg get the unshared and sole right to promotion from the state legislature
 1988: new bachelor degrees: media education and transport education
 2002: first habitation at the PH Schwäbisch Gmünd
 2004: over 2,000 students are enrolled in a bachelor or master degree at PH Schwäbisch Gmünd
 2005: a new law permits the PH Schwäbisch Gmünd more autonomy and gives it the official state of a University according to German law

Campuses 

The PH Schwäbisch Gmünd has two campuses. The main campus is Campus Hardt, featuring the administration of the university and most of the lecturing halls and institutional buildings. It is situated in the neighborhood of Oberbettringer near downtown Schwäbisch Gmünd. The secondary campus is situated directly in downtown Schwäbisch Gmünd and only houses some music students. The whole area of the two campuses combined is about 110,000 square meter.

Campus Institutions 
The Campus also houses an Institute for further education and teaching methods, a diagnostically center, a center for practical scientific research, a center for quality management and monitoring in youth- and child services as well as a so called "Bilderbuchwerkstatt BUFO".

The center for knowledge transfer of the PH Schwäbisch Gmünd was founded in 2012. Its purpose is to boost lifelong learning through scientific education and further education between research and practical application.

As of 2013, the Center for Competence in Health Promotion of the PH Schwäbisch Gmünd dedicates itself to interdisciplinary health promotion. The Center for Media Education researches educational concepts to boost the support of media education processes in and outside of educational institutions.

Leisure offerings 

The campus offers a variety of leisure offerings for students and staff of the university. On the main campus, a cafeteria/canteen provides food supply for staff and students. In the institutional building, there are several sitting areas, a student café called Matrikü(h)l which is operated by older students. The institutional building is also home to the AStA, the student committee of the PH Schwäbisch Gmünd, which helps students with general questions and organizes events.

Relevant numbers

Finances 
PH Schwäbisch Gmünd is financed by several grants and state contributions. The total number of granted financial support was 14.373.599€ in 2016. This number is divided into state funding (10.472.600€ in 2016), third party income (1.208.494€ in 2016), special programmes (2.497.105€ in 2016) and other income.

Student statistics 
PH Schwäbisch Gmünd had a total of 2.843 students in the winter semester 2016/17, of which about 2.192 were women and only 651 men. 1.857 of the total students studied teaching and were trained in teaching, while 652 students studied the non-teaching bachelor programmes. 237 master students were enrolled at the PH Schwäbisch Gmünd in 2016. In total, 2 women and 3 men promoted in 2015, while 48 promotion attempts where still ongoing in 2015.

Staff statistics 

In total, 273 people worked at the Pädagogische Hochschule Schwäbisch Gmünd in 2017. The academic staff made out 180 of these 273 people. 50 of them being active lecturing professors, 110 being active in research and scientific employment and 20 being employed by third party employers.

Faculties 
Since the PH Schwäbisch Gmünd was founded purposely to train future teachers, there are only two faculties at the Pädagogische Hochschule Schwäbisch Gmünd.

 Faculty I: Institutions of teaching and education, workforce and technology, educational sciences, human sciences, care sciences as well as theology and religious education
 Faculty II: Institutions for languages and literature, arts, society studies, mathematics and information technologies, natural sciences as well as the institutions for childhood, youth and family

Courses 
PH Schwäbisch Gmünd offers a variety of Bachelor and Master programmes for its students. Since the purpose of a university of education in Germany is to train future teachers, some of those bachelor degrees are unique to the universities of education and can only be acquired at one of the six universities of education in Baden-Württemberg.

Bachelor 
 Lehramt Grundschule (elementary school teaching)
 Lehramt Sekundarstufe I (middle- and secondary school teaching)
 Lehramt an beruflichen Schulen (professional school teaching)
 Kindheitspädagogik (childhood pedagogy)
 Gesundheitsförderung (health promotion)
 Ingenieurspädagogik (engineering pedagogy)
 Pflegewissenschaft (care sciences)
 Integrative Lerntherapie ZWPH (integrative learning therapy)
 Betriebliche Bildung ZWPH (business education)

Master 
 Lehramt Grundschule (elementary school teaching)
 Lehramt Sekundarstufe I (middle- and secondary school teaching)
 Bildungswissenschaften (education sciences)
 Interkulturalität und Integration (interculturality and integration)
 Gesundheitsförderung und Prävention (health promotion and prevention)
 Kindheits- und Sozialpädagogik (childhood and social pedagogy)
 Ingenieurspädagogik (engineering pedagogy)
 Germanistik und Interkulturalität / Multilingualität (Germanistik and interculturality / multilinguality)
 Pflegepädagogik (care pedagogy)
 Integrative Lerntherapie (integrative learning therapy)
 Personalentwicklung und Bildungsmanagement (personnel development and education management)

Additional courses 
 Erweiterungs- und Ergänzungsstudiengänge - Beratung und Medienpädagogik (expansional and additional courses - consultation and media pedagogy)
 Promotion
 Habilitation

Notable people

Rectors 
 Adalbert Neuburger (1962–1965)
 Hans Dreger (1965–1968)
 Johannes Riede (1968–1974)
 Karl Setzen (1974–1976)
 Josef Lauter (1976–1978)
 Reinhard Kuhnert (1978–1990)
 Albert Heller (1990–1994)
 Karl Setzen (1994–1998)
 Manfred Wespel (1998–2002)
 Hans-Jürgen Albers (2002–2010)
 Astrid Beckmann (2010–2018)
 Claudia Vorst (seit 2018)

Academic staff 
 Günter Altner (1936–2011), biology
 Hubert Beck (1935–2011), music
 Stephan Beck (* 1974), music
 Andreas Benk (* 1957), theology
 Albert Deibele (1889–1972), geography
 Roger Erb (* 1961), physics
 Tim Engartner (* 1976), social studies
 Martin Fix (* 1961), pedagogy
 Erich Ganzenmüller (1914–1983), music
 Axel Horn (* 1954), pedagogy and physical sciences
 Jürgen Hunkemöller (* 1939), music
 Stefan Immerfall (* 1958), sociology
 Bernhard Kaißer (1834–1918), grammar, literature and history at Lehrerseminar
 Notburga Karl (* 1973), arts
 Lutz Kasper (* 1964), physics
 Adolf Kern (1906–1976), musical training und didactics
 Hermann Kissling (1925–2018), arts
 German Josef Krieglsteiner (1937–2001), biology
 Alke Martens (* 1970), information technologies
 Wolf Mayer (* 1956), music
 Hilary Mooney (* 1962), theology
 Willy Potthoff (1925–2006), pedagogy
 Hein Retter (* 1937), pedagogy
 Thomas Retzmann (* 1963), economic pedagogy
 Rudolf Sauter (1925–2013), pedagogy
 Fridolin Schneider (1855–1922), mathematics
 Helmar Schöne (* 1966), politics
 Michael Tilly (* 1963), theology
 Franz Trautmann (* 1939), theology
 Franz Josef Wetz (* 1958), philosophy

Students 
 Peter Spranger (1926–2013), historian
 Rudolf W. Keck (* 1935), professor
 Karl Hahn (* 1937), politics
 Gudrun Ensslin (1940–1977), founder of RAF Red Army Fraction
 Werner H. A. Debler (1940–2014), pedagogy
 Wolfgang Staiger (* 1947), politics
 Wilfried Schlagenhauf (* 1952), professor at PH Freiburg
 Werner Knapp (* 1953), rector at PH Weingarten
 Mick Baumeister (* 1958), Jazzpianist
 Carsten Quesel (* 1961), sociology
 Thomas H. Häcker (* 1962), professor
 Steffen Osvath (* 1978), photography artist

References 

Universities and colleges in Baden-Württemberg
Education schools in Germany
Buildings and structures in Ostalbkreis
Educational institutions established in 1825
1820s establishments in Germany